KENN (1390 kHz) is an AM radio station broadcasting a News Talk Information format. Licensed to Farmington, New Mexico, United States, the station serves the Four Corners area.  The station is currently owned by Winton Road Broadcasting Co., LLC and features programming from Fox News Radio, Genesis Communications Network, Premiere Networks, and Westwood One.

Programming

The Glenn Beck Program airs Monday through Friday along with Sean Hannity, Mark Levin, Kilmeade & Friends, Dave Ramsey, and George Noory's Coast to Coast AM every night at midnight.  Weekends feature shows with Dr. Bob Martin, Fox News, Tom Gresham's Gun Talk, Tommy Bolack Remembers, Fox News Talk Features, Focus On The Four Corners with Debra Mayeaux, the Big E Sports Show with Elissa Walker-Campbell, Car Talk with Cliff Horace and Glenn N Gent, Law Talk featuring local attorney Eric Morrow, Money Belt Radio with Shaun Connolly, Free Talk Live, and Freedom Feens.

History

The station was first licensed, as KVBC, in 1951, to Luella M. Bowles and Marvin E. Bowles, doing business as the Valley Broadcasting Company in Farmington. It initially operated with 250 watts on 1240 kHz, which in 1957 was changed to 5,000 watts daytime and 1,000 watts at night on 1390 kHz. On September 1, 1958 the call sign was changed to KENN.

Expanded Band assignment

On March 17, 1997 the Federal Communications Commission (FCC) announced that eighty-eight stations had been given permission to move to newly available "Expanded Band" transmitting frequencies, ranging from 1610 to 1700 kHz, with KENN authorized to move from 1390 to 1620 kHz. A Construction Permit for the expanded band station, also located in Farmington, was assigned the call letters KBAG in March 1998, which was changed to KNNT a month later. However the expanded band station was never built, and its Construction Permit was cancelled on January 9, 2001.

FM Translator
In order to expand coverage of the main station, KENN also broadcasts on an FM translator at 92.1 mHz.

References

External links
American General Media Station List

 FCC History Cards for KENN (covering 1951-1980 as KVBC / KENN)

Radio stations established in 1951
News and talk radio stations in the United States
ENN